Kaotam Lookprabaht (เก้าแต้ม ลูกพระบาท) is a Thai former Muay Thai fighter. He is now a trainer at Evolve MMA in Singapore.

Titles and accomplishments
 2011 Lumpinee Stadium 118 lbs Champion
 2016 Rajadamnern Stadium 122 lbs Champion

Fight record

|-  style="background:#cfc;"
| 2018-08-29|| Win ||align=left| MOMOTARO  || SUK WAN KINGTHONG || Tokyo, Japan || Decision (Unanimous)||5 || 3:00
|-  style="background:#cfc;"
| 2017-11-05|| Win ||align=left| Hiroya Haga  || Suk wanchai + Nor.Naksin  || Tokyo, Japan || Decision ||3 || 3:00
|-  style="background:#fbb;"
| 2017-07-10|| Loss ||align=left| Pakayphet Eminentair  || Rajadamnern Stadium || Bangkok, Thailand || Decision || 5 || 3:00
|-  style="background:#fbb;"
| 2017-06-14|| Loss ||align=left| Yodkhunsuk Ratchaphatmubanchombueng  || Rajadamnern Stadium || Bangkok, Thailand || Decision || 5 || 3:00
|-  style="background:#cfc;"
| 2017-05-15|| Win ||align=left| Nungpichit Keatchuchai || Rajadamnern Stadium || Bangkok, Thailand || Decision|| 5 || 3:00 
|-
! style=background:white colspan=9 |
|-  style="background:#cfc;"
| 2017-03-29|| Win ||align=left|  Panomroonglek Kiatmuu9  || Rajadamnern Stadium || Bangkok, Thailand || Decision|| 5 || 3:00
|-  style="background:#fbb;"
| 2017-01-26|| Loss ||align=left| Nungpichit Keatchuchai || Rajadamnern Stadium || Bangkok, Thailand || Decision|| 5 || 3:00
|-  style="background:#cfc;"
| 2016-12-22|| Win ||align=left| Matee Sor.Jor Vichitpidrew || Rajadamnern Stadium || Bangkok, Thailand || Decision|| 5 || 3:00 
|-
! style=background:white colspan=9 |
|-  style="background:#cfc;"
| 2016-11-06|| Win ||align=left| Hirohito Takizawa  || SNKA KICK Insist 5 || Tokyo, Japan || Decision (Unanimous)||5 || 3:00
|-  style="background:#cfc;"
| 2015-10-03|| Win ||align=left| Sonnarai Sor.Sommai  || Rajadamnern Stadium || Bangkok, Thailand || KO || 3 ||
|-  style="background:#fbb;"
| 2016-08-19|| Win ||align=left| Wirachai Wor Wiwatananont || Lumpinee Stadium || Bangkok, Thailand || Decision || 5 || 3:00
|-  style="background:#fbb;"
| 2016-07-17|| Loss ||align=left| Matee Sor.Jor Vichitpidrew || Rajadamnern Stadium || Bangkok, Thailand || Decision|| 5 || 3:00
|-  style="background:#cfc;"
| 2016-04-04|| Win ||align=left| Khukkak Por.Paoin || Rajadamnern Stadium || Bangkok, Thailand || Decision || 5 || 3:00
|-  style="background:#cfc;"
| 2016-03-10|| Win ||align=left| Phetnamngam Aor.Kwanmuang || Rajadamnern Stadium || Bangkok, Thailand || Decision || 5 || 3:00
|-
! style=background:white colspan=9 |
|-  style="background:#cfc;"
| 2016-01-15|| Win ||align=left| Phetnamngam Aor.Kwanmuang || Lumpinee Stadium || Bangkok, Thailand || Decision || 5 || 3:00
|-  style="background:#cfc;"
| 2015-12-09|| Win ||align=left| Wirachai Wor Wiwatananont || Rajadamnern Stadium || Bangkok, Thailand || Decision || 5 || 3:00
|-  style="background:#cfc;"
| 2015-10-25|| Win ||align=left| Yodkhunsuk Ratchaphatmubanchombueng  || Rajadamnern Stadium || Bangkok, Thailand || Decision || 5 || 3:00
|-  style="background:#cfc;"
| 2015-09-02|| Win ||align=left| Yodkhunsuk Ratchaphatmubanchombueng  || Rajadamnern Stadium || Bangkok, Thailand || Decision || 5 || 3:00
|-  style="background:#fbb;"
| 2015-07-23|| Loss ||align=left| Yardfar R-Airline  || Rajadamnern Stadium || Bangkok, Thailand || Decision || 5 || 3:00
|-  style="background:#fbb;"
| 2015-06-28|| Loss ||align=left| Sonnarai Sor.Sommai  || Rajadamnern Stadium || Bangkok, Thailand || Decision || 5 || 3:00
|-  style="background:#fbb;"
| 2015-05-12|| Loss ||align=left| Suakim PK Saenchaimuaythaigym || Lumpinee Stadium || Bangkok, Thailand || Decision || 5 || 3:00
|-  style="background:#cfc;"
| 2015-01-15|| Win ||align=left| Rungphet Kiatjaroenchai || Rajadamnern Stadium || Bangkok, Thailand || Decision ||5 || 3:00
|-  style="background:#fbb;"
| 2014-09-12|| Loss ||align=left| Yuthakan Phet-Por.Tor.Or. || Rajadamnern Stadium || Bangkok, Thailand || Decision ||5 || 3:00
|-  style="background:#cfc;"
| 2014-09-12|| Win ||align=left| Denchiangkwan Lamethongarnpaet || Lumpinee Stadium || Bangkok, Thailand || Decision ||5 || 3:00
|-  style="background:#fbb;"
| 2014-08-17|| Loss ||align=left| Denchiangkwan Lamethongarnpaet || Footkien Group Tournament Final || Thailand || Decision ||5 || 3:00
|-  style="background:#cfc;"
| 2014-07-19|| Win ||align=left| Songkom Sakhomseen || Footkien Group Tournament || Thailand || Decision ||5 || 3:00
|-  style="background:#cfc;"
| 2014-04-26|| Win ||align=left| Songkom Sakhomseen ||  || Thailand || Decision ||5 || 3:00
|-  style="background:#fbb;"
| 2014-03-22|| Loss ||align=left| Petchseenin Suanarhanpeekmai  ||  || Thailand || Decision ||5 || 3:00
|-  style="background:#cfc;"
| 2014-02-25||Win ||align=left| Awutlek Kiatjaroenchai || Lumpinee Stadium || Bangkok, Thailand || Decision || 5 || 3:00
|-  style="background:#fbb;"
| 2013-12-20||Loss ||align=left| Rungpetch Kiatjaroenchai  || Lumpinee Stadium || Bangkok, Thailand || Decision || 5 || 3:00
|-  style="background:#cfc;"
| 2012-12-24||Win ||align=left| Phet Utong Or. Kwanmuang || Lumpinee Stadium || Bangkok, Thailand || Decision || 5 || 3:00
|-  style="background:#fbb;"
| 2012-11-20|| Loss ||align=left| Kaimookdam Sit Or || Lumpinee Stadium || Bangkok, Thailand || Decision || 5 || 3:00
|-  style="background:#fbb;"
| 2012-10-12|| Loss ||align=left| Rungphet Wor Rungniran  || Lumpinee Stadium || Bangkok, Thailand || Decision ||5 || 3:00
|-  style="background:#cfc;"
| 2012-08-14|| Win ||align=left| Mongkolchai Kwaitonggym || Lumpinee Stadium || Bangkok, Thailand || TKO (Low Kick)|| 2 ||
|-  style="background:#cfc;"
| 2012-06-22|| Win ||align=left| Mongkolchai Kwaitonggym || Lumpinee Stadium || Bangkok, Thailand || Decision || 5 || 3:00
|-  style="background:#fbb;"
| 2012-06-06|| Loss ||align=left| Fahmonkon Sor.Jor.Tong Prajin || Lumpinee Stadium || Bangkok, Thailand || Decision || 5 || 3:00
|-  style="background:#fbb;"
| 2012-05-01|| Loss ||align=left| Superbank Mor Ratanabandit ||  || Bangkok, Thailand || Decision || 5 || 3:00
|-  style="background:#cfc;"
| 2012-03-23|| Win ||align=left| Manasak Pinsinchai || Lumpinee Stadium || Bangkok, Thailand || Decision || 5 || 3:00
|-  style="background:#cfc;"
| 2012-01-12|| Win ||align=left| Manasak Pinsinchai || Rajadamnern Stadium || Bangkok, Thailand || Decision || 5 || 3:00
|-  style="background:#cfc;"
| 2011-12-09 || Win ||align=left| Chokpreecha Kor.Sakuncha || Lumpinee Stadium || Bangkok, Thailand || Decision || 5 || 3:00
|-  style="background:#fbb;"
| 2011-10-25 || Loss ||align=left| Kwankhao Mor.Ratanabandit || Lumpinee Stadium || Bangkok, Thailand || Decision || 5 || 3:00
|-  style="background:#fbb;"
| 2011-09-22 || Loss ||align=left| Petpanomrung Kiatmuu9  || Daprungprabaht Fights, Rajadamnern Stadium || Bangkok, Thailand || Decision || 5 || 3:00
|-  style="background:#cfc;"
| 2011-08-30 || Win ||align=left| Kaonar P.K.SaenchaiMuaythaiGym || Rajadamnern Stadium || Bangkok, Thailand || Decision || 5 || 3:00
|-  style="background:#c5d2ea;"
| 2011-07-07 || Draw||align=left| Nongbeer Choknamwong || Rajadamnern Stadium || Bangkok, Thailand || Decision || 5 || 3:00
|-  style="background:#fbb;"
| 2011-03-31|| Loss ||align=left| Kaimookdam Chuwattana || Rajadamnern Stadium || Bangkok, Thailand || Decision || 5 || 3:00
|-  style="background:#cfc;"
| 2011-03-08|| Win||align=left| Rungphet Wor Rungniran  || Lumpinee Stadium || Bangkok, Thailand || Decision ||5 || 3:00
|-
! style=background:white colspan=9 |
|-  style="background:#fbb;"
| 2010-12-23|| Loss||align=left| Rungphet Wor Rungniran || Rajadamnern Stadium || Bangkok, Thailand || Decision ||5 || 3:00
|-  style="background:#cfc;"
| 2010-10-06 || Win ||align=left| Kangwanlek Petchyindee || Rajadamnern Stadium || Bangkok, Thailand || Decision || 5 || 3:00
|-  style="background:#cfc;"
| 2010-09-14 || Win ||align=left| Ratchaburilek Sor.Jitpattana || Lumpinee Stadium || Bangkok, Thailand || Decision || 5 || 3:00

|-  style="background:#cfc;"
| 2010-08-21|| Win||align=left| Visanlek Nakhonthong || Omnoi Stadium ||Bangkok, Thailand || Decision  || 5 || 3:00
|-  style="background:#fbb;"
| 2010-06-08 || Loss||align=left| Ratchaburilek Sor.Chitpattana || Lumpinee Stadium  || Bangkok, Thailand || Decision || 5 || 3:00

|-  style="background:#cfc;"
| 2010-03-25 || Win ||align=left| Yodmongkol Mueangsima || Rajadamnern Stadium  || Bangkok, Thailand || Decision || 5 || 3:00
|-  style="background:#cfc;"
| 2009-08-11 || Win ||align=left| Nongbeer Choknamwong || Lumpinee Stadium || Bangkok, Thailand || Decision || 5 || 3:00
|-  style="background:#fbb;"
| 2009-06-30 || Loss ||align=left| Songkom Wor.Sangprapai ||  Lumpinee Stadium || Bangkok, Thailand || Decision || 5 || 3:00
|-  style="background:#fbb;"
| 2008-03-11 || Loss ||align=left| Saeksan Or. Kwanmuang || Wanboonya Fights, Lumpinee Stadium || Bangkok, Thailand || Decision || 5 || 3:00
|-  style="background:#fbb;"
| ? || Loss ||align=left| Tingtong Chor KoiyuhaIsuzu ||  || Bangkok, Thailand || Decision || 5 || 3:00
|-  style="background:#fbb;"
| ? || Loss ||align=left| Yuttachai Kiatphattharaphan ||  || Bangkok, Thailand || Decision || 5 || 3:00
|-  style="background:#cfc;"
| ? || Win ||align=left| Kaimookdam Chuwattana ||  || Bangkok, Thailand || Decision || 5 || 3:00
|-
| colspan=9 | Legend:

References

Kaotam Lookprabaht
Living people
1990 births
Kaotam Lookprabaht
Kaotam Lookprabaht